Joshua (born Jon Schumann in 1971) is a Danish and Swedish Grammy-awarded music producer and mixing engineer from Denmark. He has produced for bands such as Kent, Kashmir, Mew, D-A-D and Carpark North.

Joshua produced the 1999 breakthrough album by the Danish rock band Kashmir, The Good Life, which gave him the "Danish Producer of the Year" award at the 2000 Danish Grammy Awards. He produced the albums Tillbaka till samtiden and Röd by the Swedish alternative rock band Kent, released in 2007 and 2009, respectively. For the latter he was awarded "Producer of the Year" at the 2010 Swedish Grammy Awards. In the spring of 2010 he produced three tracks on the band's ninth studio album En plats i solen, released on 30 June. He currently resides in London, UK. ''

Selective production discography

References

External links
 Joshua at  MySpace
 Joshua at Facebook
 Joshua at Twitter
 Joshua at Discogs
 Joshua at WordPress
 Mannhandle - { music and webdesign }

Danish record producers
1971 births
Living people